Oracle Enterprise Service Bus (Oracle ESB), a fundamental component of Oracle's Services-Oriented Architecture suite of products, provides integration of data and enterprise applications within an organisation and their connected ( "extended" or “virtual”) enterprises.

Details
This release of Oracle Retail Integration Bus (RIB) Essentials includes changes in architecture, technology stack, and deployment Oracle ESB is technically an 'enterprise service bus' designed and implemented in an Oracle Fusion Architecture's SOA environment; to simplify the interaction and communication between existing Oracle products, third-party applications, or any combination of these.

As a software architecture model for distributed computing it is a specialty variant of the more general client server software architecture model and promotes strictly asynchronous message oriented design for communication and interaction between applications. Its primary use is in Enterprise Application Integration of heterogeneous and complex landscapes of an organisation, and thus enabling its easy management. 

An ESB service is designed and configured with Oracle JDeveloper and Oracle ESB Control user interfaces. It is then registered to an ESB Server. The ESB Server supports multiple protocol bindings for message delivery, including HTTP/SOAP, JMS, JCA, WSIF and Java, using synchronous/asynchronous, request/reply or publish/subscribe models. Currently, the ESB Server does not support Remote Method Invocation.

Oracle Retail Integration Bus (RIB) Essentials should not be confused with Oracle Service Bus (OSB).  ESB was developed by Oracle.  OSB, formerly known as Aqualogic Service Bus, was acquired when Oracle bought BEA Systems.  The two products are related and interchangeable.

Components
Oracle Enterprise Service Bus contains the following components:
 ESB Server
 Oracle ESB Control
 ESB Metadata Server
 Oracle JDeveloper

Features
Oracle Enterprise Service Bus application-integration features fall into the following categories:
 Server Capabilities
 Connectivity
 SOAP invocations services
 WSIF
 Adapter services
 File/FTP adapter service
 Database adapter service
 JMS adapter service
 MQ adapter service
 AQ adapter service
 Oracle Applications (OA) adapter services
 Custom adapter service
 Document Transformation : XSLT and MFL
 Content-Based and Header-Based Routing
 Tight integration with Oracle BPEL Process Manager
 Management and Monitoring Capabilities
 ESB Control, the central point for metadata and configuration changes that take effect immediately
 Visual representation of end-to-end service relationships
 Minimal overhead end-to-end message instance tracking and monitoring
 Error Hospital - automated and manual means for individual and bulk message replays

See also
 Oracle Fusion Middleware

References

External links
 Product page
 Documentation
 http://orasoa.blogspot.com/2008/11/who-is-best-osb-or-esb.html

Oracle software
Enterprise application integration